Enterprize was launched in Spain and taken in prize, or in Brazil. She became a slave ship, sailing from Liverpool in 1799, but was captured and sunk before she could embark any slaves.

Enterprize first appeared in Lloyd's Register (LR), and the Register of Shipping in 1800.

Captain Ludwick Carlile acquired a letter of marque on 1 February 1799. He sailed from Liverpool on 27 April, intending to acquire slaves in West Africa.

The captures took place off the coast at Benin. The French sank the captured vessels.

Citations

1794 ships
Age of Sail merchant ships of England
Liverpool slave ships
Captured ships